"No W" is a single by industrial metal band Ministry. The song was the first single from their 2004 album, Houses of the Molé.

Versions
Another version of this song appears on later versions of the album. This "redux" version is 2:55 in length, and has all of the samples from Carl Orff's "Carmina Burana" removed. This version of the song is featured on the video games Need for Speed: Underground 2 and Tony Hawk's Underground 2; though the version featured in the latter retains the George W. Bush speech at the beginning, the former does not. The Redux version also features a guitar solo toward the end which the other does not.

Music video
The music video features an actor dancing while wearing a crude George W. Bush mask, while the members of Ministry, wearing arabian threads, play in a desert with a choir chanting "O Fortuna" in the background.

Track listing

Personnel
Ministry 
 Al Jourgensen – vocals, rhythm guitar, bass, programming
 Mike Scaccia – lead guitar

Additional musicians
 Rey Washam – drums

2004 singles
Ministry (band) songs
2004 songs
Songs written by Al Jourgensen
Cultural depictions of George W. Bush